Ryan Lee may refer to:

Ryan Lee (actor) (born 1996), American actor
Ryan Lee (hedge fund manager), Korean American hedge fund manager and radio commentator
Ryan Lee (Home and Away), a fictional character on the Australian soap opera Home and Away

See also
Lee Ryan (born 1983), English singer-songwriter and member of the boy band Blue